Alija Bešić (born 30 March 1975, in Zavidovići, SR Bosnia and Herzegovina) is a retired Luxembourgian professional football player of Bosnian descent.

External links

1975 births
Living people
Luxembourg international footballers
Luxembourgian footballers
Union Luxembourg players 
FC Swift Hesperange players
CS Pétange players
CS Fola Esch players
Association football goalkeepers
Bosnia and Herzegovina emigrants to Luxembourg